Anders Sundström (born 26 July 1952) is a Swedish banker and former politician. Sundström became mayor of Piteå in 1979, at the age 27, he was the youngest at the time. He served as government minister, first as Minister of Employment from 1994 to 1996, Minister of Enterprise from 1996 to 1998, and Minister of Social Affairs in 1998, a position he left after only 20 days. Sundström served as Member of Parliament in 1998 and 2002-2004, and was a possible contender for the leadership of the Social Democratic Party after Håkan Juholt's resignation in January 2012. He was director of Folksam from 2004 to 2013, and later Swedbank from 2013 to 2016. Sundström is domestic partner with Social Democratic politician Anna Hallberg.

References

1952 births
Living people
20th-century Swedish politicians